Bull Allen may refer to:

 Leslie "Bull" Allen (1916–1982), Australian soldier, recipient of the United States’ Silver Star
 Mark "Bull" Allen (born 1967), New Zealand rugby player and celebrity